Legislative elections were held in France on 14 and 28 October 1877 to elect members of the Chamber of Deputies. They were held during the Seize Mai crisis.

President Patrice de MacMahon dissolved the Chamber of Deputies elected in 1876, in the hope of a conservative and royalist victory. Although royalists lost seats, Bonapartists increased their seat total over 1876; the Republicans lost 80 seats, but retained a majority.

The elections proved a serious setback for those hoping for a restoration of the monarchy, such as MacMahon. In the Senate elections of January 1879, the monarchists also lost control of the Senate. MacMahon resigned, and the Republican Jules Grévy was elected president by the National Assembly.

Along with the 1997 election, it is a rare case of an election in which the sitting President's party lost a general election which he had called.

Results

See also
1877 French legislative election in Algeria

References

External links
Map of Deputies elected in 1877 according to their group in the House, including overseas (in french)

Legislative elections in France
France
Legislative
France